Will Jason (1910–1970) was an American film and television director. He shot a number of short films for MGM during the early 1940s.

Selected filmography
 The Soul of a Monster (1944)
 Tahiti Nights (1944)
 Eve Knew Her Apples (1945)
 Ten Cents a Dance (1945)
 Blonde Alibi (1946)
 The Dark Horse (1946)
 Idea Girl (1946)
 Slightly Scandalous (1946)
 Sarge Goes to College (1947)
 Smart Politics (1948)
 Music Man (1948)
 Campus Sleuth (1948)
 Rusty Leads the Way (1948)
 Kazan (1949)
 Everybody's Dancin' (1950)
 Disc Jockey (1951)
 Chain of Circumstance (1951)
 Thief of Damascus (1952)

References

Bibliography
 Bernard A. Drew. Motion Picture Series and Sequels: A Reference Guide. Routledge, 2013.

External links

1910 births
1970 deaths
American television directors
Film directors from New York City
People from New York City